Grand Ayatollah Sheikh Ali Safi Golpaygani (Persian: علی صافی گلپایگانی) (1913 – 3 January 2010) was an Iranian Twelver Shi'a Marja. He was born in Golpayegan, Iran. He has studied in seminaries of Najaf, Iraq under Grand Ayatollah Borujerdi. He taught at the Seminary of Qom.

He died from natural causes on 3 January 2010 in Golpayegan, aged 96.

See also

Grand Ayatollahs
Lists of Maraji

References

Iranian grand ayatollahs
Iranian Islamists
Shia Islamists
1913 births
2010 deaths
People from Golpayegan
Iranian ayatollahs